Szynkielów  is a village in the administrative district of Gmina Konopnica, within Wieluń County, Łódź Voivodeship, in central Poland.

The village has a population of 860.

References

Villages in Wieluń County